Scythris nigra is a species of moth in the family Scythrididae first described by Alfred Philpott in 1931. It is endemic to New Zealand.

References

Scythrididae
Moths described in 1931
Moths of New Zealand
Endemic fauna of New Zealand
Taxa named by Alfred Philpott
Endemic moths of New Zealand